Konstantin Ivanovich Makarov (1894 – 15 May 1918) was a Soviet revolutionary and Putilov worker, member of the RSDLP since 1917.

Makarov was born in the family of a peasant in the village Yagunino, Yaguninskaya Volost, Zvenigorod Uyezd, Moscow Governorate. At twelve, he became a bookseller in a shop in the city of Berdychiv, in the Kiev Governorate. He lived and worked in Berdychiv for 7 years. After that, Makarov moved to the city of Kamenets-Podolsk, where he worked as a bookseller. Before the War of 1914, he came to his parents in his native village. In addition to land tilling, his parents were also engaged in handicraft, here Makarov was trained in turning work. He moved to Petrograd and became a Putilov worker.

In 1917, Makarov joined the Bolshevik Party. Then the Putilov organization sent him as a revolutionary propagandist to the Chernigov Governorate. On the way, he drove home where the campaign began by choice in the Russian Constituent Assembly, in which he took an active part, at rallies in 3 villages (Munino, Shikhovo and Savvinskaya Sloboda) he argued to the peasants about the need to vote for list No. 5. He was elected to the Volispolkom (Ispolkom (Executive Committee) of the Volost), then to the Uispolkom (Ispolkom (Executive Committee) of the Uyezd). The Uispolkom appointed him the chairman of the Uyezd Committee.

Later, he was appointed a commissioner of economy of the former Savvino-Storozhevsky Monastery. In this position, he had to face the monks who were on the territory of the monastery, who had prepared an uprising in May 1918. During the uprising the infuriated mob brutally beat Makarov and threw him into the pond. Makarov tried to get out of the pond, but someone from the crowd shot him with a revolver and killed him.

After his death, his old parents and his two children remained. At the request of his parents, Makarov was buried on church territory of Savvinskaya Sloboda. During the Zvenigorod uprising, two more of his assistants were shot along with Makarov: Yakov Rotnov and Vasily Dmitrievich Sokolov. There was an attempt to overthrow the Soviet usurpers in Zvenigorod, but already on 16 May the Zvenigorod uprising was suppressed.

His name is one of the streets of Zvenigorod; a memorial plaque is installed.

References

 Памятник борцам пролетарской революции, погибшим в 1917-1921 гг. : (биографический справочник) / Истпарт, Отдел ЦК РКП (б) по изучению истории Октябрьской революции и РКП (б) ; сост.: Л. Лежава и Г. Русаков. - 3-е изд., испр. и доп. - Москва ; Ленинград : Государственное издательство, 1925. - 779, (2) с. : ил., портр.;/ С. 363
 Леви Е. (сост.) Братская могила. Биографический словарь умерших и погибших членов московской организации Р.К.П. (Б.). Выпуск 2 / М.: Губернское Бюро Комиссии по истории Октябрьской , Революции и Р. К. П. (ИСТПАРТ), 1923. — 276 с.;/ С. 175; 

1894 births
1918 deaths
Russian Social Democratic Labour Party members
Old Bolsheviks
Communist Party of the Soviet Union members